The San Javier Department (in Spanish, Departamento San Javier) is an administrative subdivision (departamento) of the . It is located on the northeast of the province, with its eastern border coinciding with the provincial border along the Paraná River. 

The department's head town is the city of San Javier, which has over 15,000 inhabitants (more than half the population of the department). The department also includes the towns of Alejandra, Cacique Ariacaiquín, Colonia Durán, La Brava, and Romang.

San Javier Department borders the departments of Garay (south), San Justo (southwest), Vera (west), and General Obligado (north).

References
In Spanish.
 Government of the Province of Santa Fe
  Inforama] - Municipalities of the San Javier Department.
 

Departments of Santa Fe Province